The following lists events that happened during 2003 in New Zealand.

Population
 Estimated population as of 31 December: 4,061,600
 Increase since 31 December 2002: 72,000 (1.81%)
 Males per 100 Females: 96.2

Incumbents

Regal and viceregal
Head of State – Elizabeth II
Governor-General – Dame Silvia Cartwright PCNZM, DBE, QSO

Government
The 47th New Zealand Parliament continued. Government was a coalition between 
Labour and the small Progressive party with
United Future supporting supply votes.

Speaker of the House – Jonathan Hunt (Labour)
Prime Minister – Helen Clark (Labour)
Deputy Prime Minister – Michael Cullen (Labour)
Minister of Finance – Michael Cullen (Labour)
Minister of Foreign Affairs – Phil Goff (Labour)
Chief Justice — Sian Elias

Opposition leaders
National – Bill English then Don Brash (Leader of the Opposition)
Greens – Jeanette Fitzsimons and Rod Donald
Act – Richard Prebble
New Zealand First – Winston Peters
United Future – Peter Dunne

Main centre leaders
Mayor of Auckland – John Banks
Mayor of Hamilton – David Braithwaite
Mayor of Wellington – Kerry Prendergast
Mayor of Christchurch – Garry Moore
Mayor of Dunedin – Sukhi Turner

Events 
 11 February – Donna Awatere Huata is expelled from the caucus of political party ACT New Zealand. She remained in parliament.
 1 April – the Government Communications Security Bureau Act 2003 received Royal Assent
 24 April – New Zealand's population reaches the 4,000,000 mark, according to Statistics New Zealand's population clock.
 3 June – Air Adventures flight crashes on approach to Christchurch Airport, killing eight on board
 9 June – Announcement by the Prime Minister of the provision of a Defence Force engineering group of up to 60 personnel to work on reconstruction tasks in southern Iraq and, as part of New Zealand's continuing participation in Operation Enduring Freedom, of the intention to contribute to a Provincial Reconstruction Team in Afghanistan.
 30 June – Announcement that the North Island population reaches 3 million, North Shore City reaches 200,000 and Porirua City reaches 50,000
 5 July – 350 skiers and 70 staff were trapped in skifield facilities on Mount Ruapehu when a sudden storm closes the access road. All descend safely the next day.
 August – The Refugee Status Appeals Authority declares that Ahmed Zaoui is a genuine asylum seeker. He is moved from a maximum security to medium security prison as a result.
15 August – The Strongman Mine closes
22 August – the 2003 Fiordland earthquake strikes, in a remote part of New Zealand. 
28 October – Don Brash becomes parliamentary leader of the National Party.
October – Australian company Toll Holdings completes a takeover of Tranz Rail
18 November – the Supreme Court declares that Donna Awatere Huata has no right to her parliamentary seat.
 Evangelical Christian based political party Destiny New Zealand formed.

Arts and literature

Awards
Nick Ascroft and Sarah Quigley win the Robert Burns Fellowship.

New Zealand Book Awards
 Readers' Choice: Playing God Glenn Colquhoun
 Non-fiction: Wine Atlas of New Zealand Michael Cooper
Fiction: The Shag Incident Stephanie Johnson
Poetry: Playing God Glenn Colquhoun
History: No idle rich: The Wealthy in Canterbury & Otago 1840–1914 Jim McAloon
Lifestyle and contemporary culture: Wine Atlas of New Zealand Michael Cooper
Biography: A sort of conscience: The Wakefields Philip Temple
Illustrative: Len Castle: Potter Nancy Pel and Len Castle
Reference & Anthology: Spirit in a strange land: A Selection of New Zealand spiritual verse edited by Paul Morris, Harry Ricketts and Mike Grimshaw
Environment* Te Araroa: The New Zealand Trail Geoff Chapple

New Zealand Music Awards
A number of new categories were introduced this year: 'Highest Selling NZ Album',  'Highest Selling NZ Single', 'Best Pacific Island Album' (its predecessor 'Best Polynesian Album' last presented in 1997), and 'Best Roots Music Album'. 'Best R&B/ Hip Hop Album' was renamed 'Best Urban Album'.
Two categories were retired 'Best Children's Album', and 'Best Compilation'.
This year was also the first to feature a Lifetime Achievement Award.
 Album of the Year: The Datsuns – The Datsuns
 Pacifier – Pacifier
 Goldenhorse – Riverhead
 Bic Runga – Beautiful Collision
 Nesian Mystik – Polysaturated
 Single of the Year: Goodshirt – Sophie
 Che Fu – Misty Frequencies
 Bic Runga – Get Some Sleep
 Anika Moa – Falling in Love Again
 Nesian Mystik – It's On
 Top Group: The Datsuns – The Datsuns
 Goodshirt – Sophie
 Nesian Mystik – Polysaturated
 Breakthrough Artist of the Year: The Datsuns – The Datsuns 
 Goldenhorse – Riverhead
 Blindspott – Blindspott
 Best Male Vocalist: Che Fu – Misty Frequencies
 Jon Toogood- Pacifier (Pacifier)
 Te Awanui Pine Reeder (Nesian Mystik) – For The People
 Best Female Vocalist: Bic Runga – Beautiful Collision
 Anika Moa – Falling in Love Again
 Kirsten Morrell – Riverhead (Goldenhorse)
 Best Solo Artist (new category): Bic Runga – Beautiful Collision
 Anika Moa – Falling in Love Again
 Carly Binding – Alright With Me
 Best Urban Album: Nesian Mystik – Polysaturated
 P Money – Big Things
 Deceptikonz – Elimination
 Best Folk Album: not awarded
 Best Music Video: Joe Lonie – Sophie (Goodshirt)
 Che Fu – Misty Frequencies
 Chris Graham / Bic Runga – Something Good (Bic Runga)
 Outstanding International Achievement: The Datsuns
 Best Mana Reo Album: Ngahiwi Apanui – E Tau Nei
 Hareruia Aperama – Waiata of Bob Marley Vol 2
 Adam Whauwhau – He Hua O Roto
 Best Mana Maori Album: Upper Hutt Posse – Te Reo Maori Remixes
 Soul Paua – Pohewa
 Mahinarangi Tocker – Hei Ha
 Brother J – Be Bop A Nui
 Highest Selling NZ Album (new category): Bic Runga – Beautiful Collision
 Highest Selling NZ Single (new category): Katchafire – Giddy Up
 Producer of the Year: Bic Runga – Beautiful Collision
 P Money – Big Things (P Money)
 Geoffrey Maddock – Riverhead (Goldenhorse)
 Engineer of the Year: Clint Murphy And Dave Rhodes – Blindspott
 Jeremy Greor – Carbon (50HZ)
 Barbara Griffin – Love Not War (Annie Crummer)
 Simon Holloway & Shane Mason – K'Lee (K'Lee)
 Best Dance Album: Salmonella Dub – Outside The Dubplates
 Rhombus -Bass Player
 Subware – Subware
 Best Country Album: not awarded
 Best Jazz Album: Kevin Clark – Once Upon A Song I Flew
 Twinset – It's A Summer Feeling
 Matt Penman – The Unquiet
 Best Gospel Album: not awarded
 Best Pacific Island Album (new category): Pacific Soul – Pacific Soul
 Jamoa Jam – Tama Mai Le Pasifika
 Lapi Mariner – Just Me
 Best Roots Music Album (new category): Trinity Roots – True
 Te Vaka – Nukukehe
 Darren Watson – King Size
 Best Classical Album: New Zealand Symphony Orchestra – Douglas Lilburn: The Three Symphonies
 New Zealand Symphony Orchestra -Simon Boccanegra -Giuseppe V
 New Zealand String Quartet – Beethoven Rasumovsky Quartet
 Songwriter of the Year: Goodshirt – Sophie
 Che Fu – Misty Frequencies
 Nesian Mystik – It's On
 Best Cover Design: Campbell Hooper-Johnson – 'Flock: The Best Of The Mutton Birds
 Damian Alexander – Blindspott (Blindspott)
 Spencer Levine – Trade Secrets (Dubious Brothers)
 New Zealand Radio Programmer of the Year: Andi Dawkins – More FM Christchurch
 Andrew Szusterman – Channel Z
 John Budge – Classic Hits
 Manu Taylor – Mai FM
 Lifetime Achievement Award (new category): Dylan Taite

Performing arts

 Benny Award presented by the Variety Artists Club of New Zealand to Jim Joll.

Television
3 October: TV4 is replaced by C4.

Film
Kombi Nation
The Last Samurai
Whale Rider
17 December: World premiere of The Lord of the Rings: The Return of the King in Wellington

Internet
See: NZ Internet History

Sport

Athletics
 Todd Stevens wins his first national title in the men's marathon, clocking 2:30:09 on 3 May in Rotorua, while Maree Turner claims her first in the women's championship (2:55:40).

Basketball
 The NBL won by the Wellington Saints who beat the Waikato Titans 97–88 in the final.
 The Women's NBL was won by the Wellington Swish who beat the Waikato Lady Titans 86–82 in the final

Horse racing

Harness racing
 New Zealand Trotting Cup – Just an Excuse
 Auckland Trotting Cup – Elsu
 New Zealand Free For All – Jack Cade

Motor racing
 12 October – Scott Dixon wins the 2003 Indy Racing League Championship

Netball
 The 11th Netball World Championships were held in Kingston, Jamaica. New Zealand won, beating Australia in the final.

Rugby union
 11 October – Auckland defeat Canterbury to win the Ranfurly Shield, ending Canterbury's run of 23 defences.
 11 October – New Zealand beat Italy (70–7) in pool D of the Rugby World Cup
 17 October – New Zealand beat Canada (68–6) in pool D of the Rugby World Cup
 24 October – New Zealand beat Tonga (91–7) in pool D of the Rugby World Cup
 2 November – New Zealand beat Wales (53–37) in pool D of the Rugby World Cup, finishing top of pool D
 8 November – New Zealand beat South Africa (29–9) in the first quarter-final of the Rugby World Cup
 15 November – New Zealand lose to Australia (10–22) in the first semi-final of the Rugby World Cup
 20 November – Playoff: (Loser SF1 v Loser SF2) New Zealand beat France (40–13) to take 3rd place in the Rugby World Cup

Rugby league
 Bartercard Cup won by Canterbury Bulls
 The New Zealand Warriors finished 6th (of 15 teams) in the minor premiership, qualifying for the finals series, where they won two games before losing the preliminary final to minor premieres the Penrith Panthers.

Shooting
Ballinger Belt – 
 Ian Shaw (United Kingdom)
 Ross Geange (Masterton), fourth, top New Zealander

Soccer
 New Zealand National Soccer League won by Miramar Rangers
 The Chatham Cup is won by University-Mount Wellington who beat Melville United 3–1 in the final.

Yachting
 19 January – Swiss yacht Alinghi, skippered by Russell Coutts, beats Oracle BMW Racing 4–1 to win the Louis Vuitton Cup off Auckland and goes on to challenge Team New Zealand for the 2003 America's Cup.
 2 March – Alinghi, skippered by Russell Coutts, beats Team New Zealand boat New Zealand skippered by Dean Barker 5–0 to win the 2003 America's Cup

Births
 8 January – Sosefo Fifita, rugby league player
 18 February – Jeremiah Nanai, rugby league player
 24 February – Jackson Manuel, association footballer
 13 March – Patricia Maliepo, rugby union player
 19 March – Caleb Tangitau, rugby union player
 23 March – Davvy Moale, rugby league player
 19 April – April Ngatupuna, rugby union and rugby league player
 22 April – Che Clark, rugby union player
 12 May – Kelsey Teneti, rugby union player
 25 May – Deine Mariner, rugby league player
 13 August – Cameron Gray, swimmer
 23 August – Efficient, Thoroughbred racehorse
 23 September – Finn Surman, association footballer
 31 October – Green Birdie, Thoroughbred racehorse
 17 November – Callum Hedge, racing driving
 24 November – Charlotte Cleverley-Bisman, face of campaign against meningococcal disease
 31 December – Erika Fairweather, swimmer
 Undated
 Deine Mariner, rugby league player
 Manaia Nuku, rugby union player
 Raymond Tuputupu, rugby union player

Deaths

January–March
 6 January – Hirini Melbourne, composer, singer, writer and academic (born 1949)
 7 January – Charisma, eventing horse (foaled 1972)
 8 January – Mac Price, diplomat (born 1948)
 16 January – Bruce Juddery, journalist (born 1941)
 17 January – Phil Hawksworth, badminton player (born 1913)
 20 January – Cleone Rivett-Carnac, athlete (born 1933)
 21 January
 James Clark, cricketer (born 1910)
 Les Lock, racing cyclist (born 1929)
 22 January – Dylan Taite, drummer, rock music journalist (born 1937)
 29 January – Bill Sewell, poet (born 1951)
 30 January – Ron Buchan, lawn bowler (born 1907)
 1 February – Bill Meates, rugby union player (born 1923)
 2 February – Stan Cowman, cricket umpire (born 1923)
 13 February – Bright Williams, last surviving New Zealand-born veteran of World War I (born 1897)
 22 February – Sir Frank Callaway, music educator and administrator (born 1919)
 25 February – Marion Robinson, physiologist, nutritionist (born 1923)
 7 March – Sid Scales, cartoonist (born 1916)
 19 March – Tori Reid, rugby union player (born 1912)
 27 March – Edwin Carr, composer (born 1926)

April–June
 5 April – Irihapeti Ramsden, nurse, educator (born 1946)
 7 April – John Rymer, Anglican cleric (born 1924)
 8 April – Harry Frazer, rugby union player (born 1916)
 14 April – John Kent, cartoonist (born 1937)
 22 April – Ian Marshall, association football player and coach (born 1942)
 27 April – Albert Richards, athlete (born 1924)
 29 April – Ron Barclay, politician (born 1914)
 30 April – Possum Bourne, rally driver (born 1956)
 5 May – Margaret Dalziel, English literature academic (born 1916)
 12 May – Stan Lay, athlete (born 1906)
 24 May
 Neil Cherry, environmental scientist (born 1946)
 Kaarene Fitzgerald, advocate for study and treatment of sudden infant death (born 1944)
 28 May – Phil Holloway, politician (born 1917)
 29 May
 Joanna Paul, visual artist, poet, filmmaker (born 1945)
 Sina Woolcott, artist (born 1907)
 2 June – Kenneth Maddock, anthropology academic (born 1937)
 5 June – Alister Abernethy, trade unionist, politician and public servant (born 1920)
 9 June – Jack Henry, silviculturist and businessman (born 1917)
 12 June – Monty Monteith, clergyman (born 1904)
 14 June – Joyce Powell, cricketer (born 1922)
 15 June – David Holt, association footballer (born 1952)
 20 June – Thomas Freeman, cricketer (born 1923)

July–September
 6 July – Peter Howden, cricketer (born 1911)
 13 July – Lin Colling, rugby union player, coach and administrator (born 1946)
 20 July – Bill Schaefer, field hockey player (born 1925)
 21 July – John Davies, athlete (born 1938)
 24 July – Dame Ella Campbell, botanist (born 1910)
 25 July – Joan Talbot, fashion designer and retailer (born 1927)
 30 July – Agnes Ell, cricketer (born 1917)
 3 August – Joyce Macdonald, swimmer (born 1922)
 7 August – Mike Hinge, illustrator and graphic designer (born 1931)
 8 August – Allan McCready, politician (born 1916)
 9 August
 Rex Challies, cricketer (born 1924)
 Corran McLachlan, chemical engineer, entrepreneur (born 1944)
 12 August – Alan McLean, cricketer (born 1911)
 22 August – Dorothea Anne Franchi, pianist, harpist, music educator and composer (born 1920)
 27 August – Mick Connelly, politician (born 1916)
 2 September – Dame Ann Ballin, clinical psychologist, victims' rights advocate and disabilities campaigner (born 1932)
 5 September – Sir Richard Harrison, politician (born 1921)
 7 September
 David Spence, mathematician (born 1926)
 Merv Wellington, politician (born 1940)
 11 September – Frances King, cricketer (born 1980)
 15 September – Anthony Treadwell, architect (born 1922)
 19 September
 Max Brown, writer (born 1916)
 Adrian Shelford, rugby league player (born 1964)
 23 September – Dennis McEldowney, writer and editor (born 1926)
 25 September – Bill Wolfgramm, musician (born 1925)

October–December
 3 October
 Lyall Barry, swimmer (born 1926)
 Savenaca Siwatibau, Fijian public servant and university administrator (born 1940)
 18 October – Frank O'Flynn, politician (born 1918)
 31 October – Lindsay Weir, cricketer (born 1908)
 5 November – Muriel Boswell, netball player (born 1915)
 12 November – Cameron Duncan, filmmaker (born 1986)
 15 November – Tom Kneebone, cabaret performer and actor (born 1932)
 16 November – Theo Allen, athlete (born 1914)
 23 November – Nick Carter, cyclist (born 1924)
 24 November – Millie Khan, lawn bowler (born 1938)
 26 November – Brian Wybourne, physics academic (born 1935)
 17 December – James Coe, artist, art teacher, industrial designer (born 1917)
 25 December – Patrick O'Farrell, history academic (born 1933)

See also
History of New Zealand
List of years in New Zealand
Military history of New Zealand
Timeline of New Zealand history
Timeline of New Zealand's links with Antarctica
Timeline of the New Zealand environment

References

External links

 
New Zealand
New Zealand
Years of the 21st century in New Zealand
2000s in New Zealand